Wendell Butler Jr. (born 1943/1944) is a former American politician who served as a Republican mayor of Chester, Pennsylvania, from 2002 to 2012.

Biography
Butler was born and raised in Chester, where he lived in a federal housing project and attended Chester Public schools. He moved to Ridley Township while a junior in high school and graduated in 1962 from Ridley High School. He served in the U.S. Army for three years before returning to Chester, where he worked for American Viscose Corporation in Marcus Hook, Pennsylvania. In 1969, he joined the Chester Police force. In 1989, he was promoted to sergeant, and in 1994 he was promoted to major as part of the command staff. In January 1996, he was named by Mayor Aaron Wilson Jr. as police commissioner.

On October 9, 2002, the city council appointed him as mayor to complete the term of fellow Republican Dominic F. Pileggi, who was named to replace State Senator Clarence D. Bell, who had died in office. He won re-election to two additional terms after his appointment. In 2010, he implemented a state of emergency and nighttime curfew after a spate of murders, including the killing of 2-year-old Terrance Webster.

In the 2011 Chester Mayoral election, he lost his bid for re-election to Democrat John Linder ending long-time Republican control of the Chester government. There had previously been one Democratic mayor, Barbara Bohannan-Sheppard, since 1905.

In 2015, he unsuccessfully ran again for mayor against Democratic candidate Thaddeus Kirkland, who had defeated Linder in the primary. In 2012, he was named by the Delaware County Council to serve a five-year term on the board of the Chester Water Authority.

Personal life
Butler is married to Tanya Butler; they have three children, Elaine, Dondi, and Dirk.

See also
List of mayors of Chester, Pennsylvania

References

|-

21st-century American politicians
African-American mayors in Pennsylvania
American municipal police chiefs
Mayors of Chester, Pennsylvania
Pennsylvania Republicans
People from Chester, Pennsylvania
African-American people in Pennsylvania politics
Ridley High School alumni
Living people
1940s births
Year of birth missing (living people)
21st-century African-American politicians
Black conservatism in the United States